The Gown of Destiny is a 1917 American silent drama film directed by Lynn Reynolds and starring Alma Rubens, Herrera Tejedde and Allan Sears. The film shows how a dress performs a patriotic function for France during World War One even though its designer is refused military service. Its wardrobe was designed by Peggy Hamilton and Hickson Inc. of New York's Fifth Avenue.

Synopsis

During World War One, a fictional French dress designer in the United States, André Leriche, is refused service in the French army on the grounds that because of his effeminate profession he is not strong enough. He returns to his work and makes a sari-inspired dress that so impresses the unfaithful husband of the buyer Mrs Reyton that he returns to her. As a gift to his wife, Mr Reyton sends three ambulances to the front to help with the French war effort against the Germans, so the dress performs a patriotic function even though its maker cannot.

When Mrs Reyton gives the dress to her niece, it transforms her from a wallflower to a young woman so beautiful that a playboy falls in love with her and is so transformed that he joins the military and wins a medal when he saves Leriche's home town, and so his father, from the Germans. The dress, therefore, performs a further patriotic function.

Cast
 Alma Rubens as Natalie Drew
 Herrera Tejedde as André Leriche
 Allan Sears as Neil Cunningham
 Lillian West as Mrs. Reyton
 J. Barney Sherry as Mr. Reyton
 Pietro Buzzi as Lucien Leriche
 Frederick Vroom as Sir John Cunningham
 Bliss Chevalier as Mme. Felice
 Gino Corrado Man in French Consulate office

References

Bibliography
 Robert B. Connelly. The Silents: Silent Feature Films, 1910-36, Volume 40, Issue 2. December Press, 1998.

External links
 

1917 films
1917 drama films
1910s English-language films
American silent feature films
Silent American drama films
American black-and-white films
Triangle Film Corporation films
Films directed by Lynn Reynolds
1910s American films